Efim Jourist (January 13, 1947 – January 13, 2007) was a Russian and German composer, accordionist and bajan player.

Life 
Efim Jourist was born in Siberia. From 1966 until 1971 he studied at the conservatory of Gorky where he made the acquaintance of the composer Nikolai Chaykin. This connection had a great influence on his musical development. After his graduation he became a soloist with the Krasnoyask Philharmonic orchestra and he started on an international career.
Jourist came to Germany with his family in 1992, where he continued giving recitals. Jourist also founded the quartet Efim Jourist Quartett which consists of bajan, violin, guitar and double bass. With his quartet he has played on many international festivals, like the Rheingau Musik Festival in Germany. The quartet can be extended to the Efim Jourist Ensemble which consists of marimba/vibraphone and percussion in addition. During his life Jourist has arranged many compositions of mainly soviet composers for his ensembles and he has composed himself for bajan and orchestra.
Efim Jourist died from cancer on his 60th birthday in Hamburg, Germany.

Major works

Orchestra 
 Carmen-Fantasie (1998)
 arrangement of Georges Bizet, for bajan and orchestra
 Hommage à Astor Piazola (1996)
 for orchestra
 Hummelflug (Schwarzäugige Hummel) (1995, "Flight of the Bumblebee")
 arrangement of Nikolai Rimsky-Korsakov, for bajan und orchestra
 La Russie (1995)
 tango-rhapsody for bajan & orchestra
 Pavane 
 for strings
 Vier Jahreszeiten (2006)
 arrangement of Astor Piazzolla, for bajan & chamber orchestra

Quartet 
 Bilder aus dem alten Russland (1995, "Pictures from Old Russia")
 Ich danke dir, mein Herz (1995, "I thank you, my heart")
 Russische Rhapsodie (1995, "Russian Rhapsody")
 La Russie (1995)
 tango-concerto
 Ein weiter Weg (2000, "A long Way")
 arrangement of Boris Fomin
 Tango Pizzicato (2001)
 Rondo Capriccioso (2003)
 arrangement of Felix Mendelssohn-Bartholdy's Rondo für Klavier op. 33

Chamber music 
 Korobejniki (1980)
 Russian tune, for bajan 
 Moldavia Chora (1983)
 Russian tune, for bajan
 Süße Beere (1985, "Sweet Berry")
 Russian tune, for bajan
 Schwarze Augen (1985, "Black Eyes")
 Russian tune, für bajan
 Polowetzer Tänze (1998, "Polovtsian Dances")
 arrangement from Alexander Borodin's opera "Fürst Igor", for bajan 
 Toccata (2002)
 for flute, bass clarinet, drums, bajan, piano, cello & double bass
 Erinnerung an Buenos Aires (2002, "Memories of Buenos Aires")
 for bass clarinet, drums, piano, cello & double bass
 Am Grab von A. Piazolla (2002, "At A. Piazolla's Grave")
 for bajan, guitar, piano, violine & double bass
 Vier Jahreszeiten (2006, "Four Seasons")
 arrangement of Astor Piazzolla, trio for piano 
 Russische Taverne (Dialog zweier Trinker), "Russian Taverna (Dialogue of two Drunkards)"
 for violine & piano

Vocal 
 Sechs Lieder nach Gedichten von Heinrich Heine (2002, "Six Songs from Heinrich Heine's Poems")
 for singing voice, piano/bajan, violine, guitar & double bass

References

External links 
 http://www.efim-jourist.de
 Jourist, Efim
 Efim Jourist Biographie
 Efim Jourist Werkverzeichnis
 Verblüffend und unterhaltsam: Efim Jourist und seine Tango-Arrangements

1947 births
2007 deaths
Russian composers
20th-century accordionists
German composers